The Second Battle of the Java Sea was the last naval action of the Netherlands East Indies campaign, of 1941–42. It occurred on 1 March 1942, two days after the first Battle of the Java Sea. It saw the end of the last Allied warships operating in the waters around Java, allowing Japanese forces to complete their conquest of the Dutch East Indies unhindered.

Background

The American-British-Dutch-Australian Command fleet were defeated at the first Battle of the Java Sea, on 27 February 1942, and its ships had been dispersed or sunk by the Japanese.

The light cruiser  and the heavy cruiser  had retreated to Tanjung Priok, the port of the capital, Batavia, in the west of the island. They planned to withdraw via the Sunda Strait to Tjilatjap on the south of the island and departed on the evening of 28 February; but encountering the Japanese Western Invasion Force later that night in Bantam Bay, they were both sunk in the battle of Sunda Strait; in a related but separate action, the Dutch destroyer HNLMS Evertsen was also destroyed.

The heavy cruiser —severely damaged in the first Battle of the Java Sea—had withdrawn to Surabaya in the east, escorted by the Dutch destroyer .

On 28 February, after nightfall, DesDiv 58 (and ) departed for Australia via Surabaya's shallow eastern channel, and then exited the Java area by going south through the Bali Strait; after a brief encounter with Japanese destroyers they arrived safely at Fremantle on 4 March.

After emergency repairs, Exeter also left for further repairs in Ceylon, leaving at dusk on 28 February, and escorted by Encounter and Pope. Witte de With was unable to leave, due to mechanical trouble, and was later bombed and sunk at Surabaya on 2 March.

As Exeter had too much draft for leaving the main anchorage at Surabaya via its southern (thence eastern) channel, she was forced to leave via the main north entrance with a decision having been made to exit the Java Sea via Sunda Strait to the west, which was thought to be still open; the morning of 1 March found the three Allied ships west-northwest of Bawean island, heading westwards. The ships were making , as much as Exeter could manage.

The battle
At 04:00 on 1 March, ships were sighted to the west; being in no condition for a battle, Exeter and her two consorts changed course to the northwest to avoid contact.

More ships were sighted at 07:50, bearing southwest; again, the Allied ships had to alter course to avoid them.

Closing in on either side of the fleeing Allied ships, the cruisers opened fire at 10:20 as they came in range.

As the four Japanese cruisers closed in on Exeter, Encounter and Pope were ordered to break contact and make for a nearby rain squall in an attempt to shake off pursuit. Struck by multiple shell hits, Exeter was brought to a standstill, and the destroyer Inazuma closed in for a torpedo attack, hitting Exeter with two torpedoes on her starboard side.

The Japanese cruisers had by then already switched their attention to the fleeing destroyers; Encounter however had gallantly disobeyed her orders to escape and had previously turned back to lay a smoke screen to protect the immobilised Exeter, and aid survivors, but had soon been immobilised herself by shell hits and set on fire. Lieutenant Commander Eric 'Rattler' Morgan, the destroyer's captain, ordered his ship scuttled to prevent her capture by the Japanese and she capsized and sank about 12:10. Pope continued to evade and was able to reach the rain squall and was lost to sight.

The respite was short-lived, however; shortly after noon she was spotted by planes from the aircraft carrier , which was covering the Western Invasion Force; she was dive-bombed and sunk around 13:50.

There were just over 800 survivors altogether; these were rescued and imprisoned by the Japanese, with 190 of them subsequently dying in captivity.

The wrecks
The remains of the wreck of USS Pope was discovered in late 2008, but was found to have already been heavily salvaged.

In November 2016, a diving expedition discovered that the wrecks of HMS Exeter and HMS Encounter were missing from the ocean floor. The Guardian newspaper subsequently reported that the wrecks of HMS Exeter, HMS Encounter, and part of HMS Electra, as well as the submarine USS Perch were missing and presumed illegally scavenged. Commenting on their removal, one of the men involved in their original discovery is stunned at the magnitude of the salvaging that appears to have taken place.

References

Bibliography
Stephen Roskill: The War at Sea 1939-1945 Vol II (1956) ISBN (none)
Samuel Eliot Morison: History of United States Naval operations in World War II: Vol III The Rising Sun in the Pacific (1948) ISBN (none)
Eric Groves: Sea Battles in Close-Up WWII Vol 2 (1993) 
Donald MacIntyre: The Battle for the Pacific (1966) ISBN (none)

Military history of Indonesia
South West Pacific theatre of World War II
Naval battles of World War II involving the United States
Java Sea
Naval battles of World War II involving Japan
1942 in Japan
Java Sea
Japanese occupation of the Dutch East Indies
March 1942 events

ja:スラバヤ沖海戦#三月一日昼戦